One Careful Owner is a 2020 Spanish comedy film directed by Bernabé Rico, starring Kiti Mánver and Juana Acosta.

The film was nominated for three Goya Awards and two Feroz Awards. It was produced by La Claqueta PC and Talycual Producciones alongside El inconveniente AIE and La Cruda Realidad, with participation of Canal Sur Radio y Televisión and RTVE.

Plot 
Sara (Juana Acosta) is offered a perfect luxurious apartment at low rent. But there is one condition that she can't move in until the current owner Lola (Kiti Mánver) dies.

Cast
 Kiti Mánver as Lola
 Juana Acosta as Sara
 Carlos Areces as Óscar
 Daniel Grao as Daniel
 José Sacristán as Víctor

Awards

References

External links
 

2020 films
Spanish comedy films
2020s Spanish-language films
2020 comedy films
La Claqueta PC films
2020s Spanish films
2020 directorial debut films